Oreana is an unincorporated community in Owyhee County, Idaho, United States.

Our Lady, Queen of Heaven Church, which is listed on the National Register of Historic Places, is located near Oreana.

References

External links

Unincorporated communities in Owyhee County, Idaho
Unincorporated communities in Idaho